The Cathedral of the Lord of Burgos Also Huánuco Cathedral is the name of a religious building affiliated to the Catholic Church located in the city of Huánuco, Peru.

The temple follows the Roman or Latin rite and is the mother church of the Diocese of Huánuco ( Dioecesis Huanucensis ) which was created in 1865 by the bull Singulari animi Nostri of Pope Pius IX. The original building was built in 1618. In 1965 it was demolished. The new cathedral was built by the German architect Kuno.

It is under the pastoral responsibility of Bishop Neri Menor Vargas.

See also
Roman Catholicism in Peru
Burgos Cathedral

References

Roman Catholic cathedrals in Peru
Roman Catholic churches completed in 1965
20th-century Roman Catholic church buildings in Peru